Eucosmomorpha figurana is a moth of the family Tortricidae. It is found in and is possibly endemic to Vietnam.

References

Olethreutinae
Moths of Asia
Moths described in 1997